Caroline M. Solomon is an American academic whose teaching focuses on bringing deaf and hard-of-hearing students into the fields of science, technology, engineering, and mathematics. Having experienced first-hand the problems for deaf students in classrooms without sign language interpreters, Solomon, who teaches biology at Gallaudet University, has designed databases to help students and teachers network with organizations and interpreters familiar with educational bridges for deaf and hard-of-hearing students. She is a co-creator of a database that formalizes the lexicon of signs used for scientific and technological terms in American Sign Language. Her innovations to teaching techniques were recognized with the Ramón Margalef Award for Excellence in Education of the Association for the Sciences of Limnology and Oceanography in 2017.

Early life
Caroline Solomon grew up in Delaware and contracted spinal meningitis as an infant, which resulted in her being deaf in a hearing family. As a teenager, she participated in the Deaflympics as a swimmer and became interested in the environment because she was unable to swim in a heavily polluted creek near their home. Upon graduation from high school, she enrolled at Harvard University, studying both environmental science and public policy. When she entered Harvard, there were no sign language interpreters on the staff, but the university hired one midway through Solomon's first semester. She graduated with a Bachelor of Arts in 1996. Furthering her education, Solomon went on to earn a master's degree in biological oceanography from the University of Washington. Solomon earned her a PhD in biological oceanography from the University of Maryland in 2006.

Career
After completion of her master's, Solomon, who wanted to inspire other deaf and hard-of-hearing students, joined the faculty of Gallaudet University in 2000. She was promoted to full professor in 2011. Her research focuses on the ecological effects that occur when algae, bacteria, and viruses interact with nitrogen byproducts from agricultural production and other human activity. Studying waterways such as the Chesapeake Bay and the Anacostia River, she analyzes the occurrence of algal blooms and pollutants to determine prevention measures which can be implemented in conservation efforts.

Recognizing that her students are more visual than auditory, Solomon often demonstrates lessons in a visual way, such as lining up chairs to represent skin and having a student playing a pathogen try to break through. Working in tandem with the Anacostia Riverkeeper Project, the DC Water Research and Resources Institute, the Department of Energy and Environment, the Maryland Sea Grant College Program, and the National Science Foundation's Research Experiences for Undergraduates program, Solomon conducts summer research projects to help students not only learn how to research, but to understand the need to communicate their findings to create conservation policy.

In addition to her own research and teaching, Solomon has been instrumental in hosting national workshops to increase participation of deaf and hard-of-hearing students in STEM fields. In 2012, she led a workshop for the National Science Foundation to discuss ways to create mentoring opportunities for deaf scientists throughout their career trajectory. Out of this workshop was born a program to create a database to be used as a reference network, including organizations which support scientists with hearing loss and interpreters who have knowledge of scientific terminology. Working with colleagues from the University of Washington, Solomon developed a database of the technical signs used in American Sign Language for scientific terminology in an effort to standardize the lexicon.

Awards and honors 
Solomon was recognized with the 2013 Distinguished Faculty Award from Gallaudet and in 2017 by the Association for the Sciences of Limnology and Oceanography's Ramón Margalef Award for Excellence in Education for her innovations to teaching.

In 2020, she was inducted into the Deaflympics Hall of Fame for her swimming achievements.

References

Citations

Bibliography

Year of birth missing (living people)
Living people
Scientists from Delaware
21st-century American biologists
Educators of the deaf
University of Washington College of the Environment alumni
Harvard University alumni
Gallaudet University faculty
American deaf people
American women biologists
21st-century American women scientists
American limnologists
American oceanographers
Women limnologists
Scientists with disabilities
American women academics